Bernard Merivale (1882–1939) was a British playwright and screenwriter.

Several of his plays were adapted into films including Blondie White, The Wrecker and The Unguarded Hour.

Selected filmography
 The Flying Fool (1931)
 Condemned to Death (1932)
 When London Sleeps (1932)
 Seven Sinners (1936)

Plays
 None But the Brave (1925)
 The Wrecker (1927)
 The Unguarded Hour (1935)
 Blondie White (1938)

References

Bibliography 
 Goble, Alan. The Complete Index to Literary Sources in Film. Walter de Gruyter, 1999.
 Kabatchnik, Amnon. Blood on the Stage, 1925-1950: Milestone Plays of Crime, Mystery and Detection. Scarecrow Press, 2010.

External links 
 

1882 births
1939 deaths
Writers from Newcastle upon Tyne
British male dramatists and playwrights
20th-century British screenwriters